Here's Tom with the Weather (stylized as ...here's tom with the weather) is Liverpool band Shack's fourth studio album, which reached the number 55 position in the UK charts when it was released in 2003.

The album's chief songwriter Mick Head wrote 10 of the 13 songs on the album, with his brother John Head writing the remaining 3 songs. Michael Head famously appeared on the cover of the NME in October 1999 billed as "our greatest songwriter".

The album was named after a quote by cult US comedian Bill Hicks:

“Today a young man on acid realized that all matter is merely energy condensed to a slow vibration, that we are all one consciousness experiencing itself subjectively, there is no such thing as death, life is only a dream, and we are the imagination of ourselves. Here's Tom with the weather.”

The album was recorded at Bryn Derwen studios in Bethesda, Wales, during May and June 2003, and featured cover photography by Harry Ainscough, known for his photographs from the 1960s and 1970s of inner cities in the north of England.

The album received largely positive reviews, following the critical acclaim of Shack's previous outing - HMS Fable, which was released in 1999. The BBC stated, "Shack are back and in exquisite form, even if initially they do sound slightly muted."

The Guardian gave the album a 4/5 star rating, as did AllMusic.

The album was toured during 2003, and lead single "Byrds Turn to Stone" was released in October 2003. The single reached position 63 in the UK charts.

Track listing 

All songs were written by Michael Head except tracks 6, 8, 11, written by John Head. All tracks produced by Michael Head, John Head and Jay Reynolds.

Personnel

References 

Shack (band) albums
2003 albums